Deh-e Khalifeh (also Romanized as Deh-e Khalīfeh; also known as Khalīfeh) is a village in Sarfaryab Rural District, Sarfaryab District, Charam County, Kohgiluyeh and Boyer-Ahmad Province, Iran. At the 2006 census, its population was 167, in 36 families.

References 

Populated places in Charam County